The enzyme  1-alkyl-2-acetylglycerophosphocholine esterase (EC 3.1.1.47) catalyzes the reaction

1-alkyl-2-acetyl-sn-glycero-3-phosphocholine + H2O  1-alkyl-sn-glycero-3-phosphocholine + acetate

The former is also known as platelet-activating factor. There are multiple enzymes with this function:
 Lipoprotein-associated phospholipase A2
 Platelet-activating factor acetylhydrolase 2, cytoplasmic
 Platelet-activating factor acetylhydrolase 1b: regulatory subunit 1, catalytic subunit 2, catalytic subunit 3

This enzyme belongs to the family of hydrolases, specifically those acting on carboxylic ester bonds.  The systematic name of this enzyme class is 1-alkyl-2-acetyl-sn-glycero-3-phosphocholine acetohydrolase. Other names in common use include 1-alkyl-2-acetyl-sn-glycero-3-phosphocholine acetylhydrolase, and alkylacetyl-GPC:acetylhydrolase.  This enzyme participates in ether lipid metabolism.

Structural studies

References

 

 
 

EC 3.1.1
Enzymes of known structure